John J. Carson was a 20th-century American politician who served in the Truman Administration as a commissioner of the Federal Trade Commission (FTC) from 1949 to 1953. A Republican who was nominated to one of the party's posts on the FTC, he nevertheless drew ire from his own party owing to his past association with a group of business cooperatives.

Background
Carson was born in Smith Valley, Indiana, an unincorporated community south of Indianapolis, where he then grew up.

Career
Carson's first job was as a messenger boy for the president of the American National Bank of Indianapolis. He then worked for the Van Camp Packing Company as bookkeeper and accountant. By 1912, he had gone into journalism and had become city editor in Indianapolis.

In 1918, Carson assigned a job in Washington, D.C., as an assistant correspondent for the St. Louis Globe-Democrat newspaper and moved shortly thereafter to the St. Louis Republic newspaper.  Then, he moved to the Baltimore Sun, where he came to know H. L. Mencken and then the Scripps-Howard Evening Sun through 1922.

Although Carson was a Republican, he faced allegations of socialism from Republican Senators such as John W. Bricker due to his past association with a group of business cooperatives. Carson maintained that his support for cooperatives was not rooted in socialism, but rather in the ideals expressed in the quadragesimo anno, an encyclical issued by Pope Pius XI that condemned unregulated capitalism. As a member of the FTC, his term overlapped closely with that of Stephen J. Spingarn.

See also

 List of former FTC commissioners
 Stephen J. Spingarn
 Harry S. Truman

References

1888 births
1971 deaths
American labor lawyers
Franklin D. Roosevelt administration personnel
United States presidential advisors
Truman administration personnel
Eisenhower administration personnel
Federal Trade Commission personnel